The Nizhnevartovsk constituency (No.223) is a Russian legislative constituency in the Khanty-Mansi Autonomous Okrug. The constituency covers Surgut and eastern part of the region.

Members elected

Election results

1993

|-
! colspan=2 style="background-color:#E9E9E9;text-align:left;vertical-align:top;" |Candidate
! style="background-color:#E9E9E9;text-align:left;vertical-align:top;" |Party
! style="background-color:#E9E9E9;text-align:right;" |Votes
! style="background-color:#E9E9E9;text-align:right;" |%
|-
|style="background-color:"|
|align=left|Vladimir Medvedev
|align=left|Independent
|
|32.11%
|-
|style="background-color:"|
|align=left|Aleksandr Gilev
|align=left|Independent
| -
|20.20%
|-
| colspan="5" style="background-color:#E9E9E9;"|
|- style="font-weight:bold"
| colspan="3" style="text-align:left;" | Total
| 
| 100%
|-
| colspan="5" style="background-color:#E9E9E9;"|
|- style="font-weight:bold"
| colspan="4" |Source:
|
|}

1995

|-
! colspan=2 style="background-color:#E9E9E9;text-align:left;vertical-align:top;" |Candidate
! style="background-color:#E9E9E9;text-align:left;vertical-align:top;" |Party
! style="background-color:#E9E9E9;text-align:right;" |Votes
! style="background-color:#E9E9E9;text-align:right;" |%
|-
|style="background-color:"|
|align=left|Vladimir Medvedev (incumbent)
|align=left|Independent
|
|28.66%
|-
|style="background-color:"|
|align=left|Nikolay Krupinin
|align=left|Independent
|
|19.42%
|-
|style="background-color:"|
|align=left|Gennady Levin
|align=left|Independent
|
|16.07%
|-
|style="background-color:"|
|align=left|Vladimir Tikhonov
|align=left|Democratic Alternative
|
|12.57%
|-
|style="background-color:"|
|align=left|Viktor Kononov
|align=left|Communist Party
|
|8.70%
|-
|style="background-color:#000000"|
|colspan=2 |against all
|
|13.29%
|-
| colspan="5" style="background-color:#E9E9E9;"|
|- style="font-weight:bold"
| colspan="3" style="text-align:left;" | Total
| 
| 100%
|-
| colspan="5" style="background-color:#E9E9E9;"|
|- style="font-weight:bold"
| colspan="4" |Source:
|
|}

1999

|-
! colspan=2 style="background-color:#E9E9E9;text-align:left;vertical-align:top;" |Candidate
! style="background-color:#E9E9E9;text-align:left;vertical-align:top;" |Party
! style="background-color:#E9E9E9;text-align:right;" |Votes
! style="background-color:#E9E9E9;text-align:right;" |%
|-
|style="background-color:"|
|align=left|Aleksandr Ryazanov
|align=left|Independent
|
|42.20%
|-
|style="background-color:"|
|align=left|Aleksey Yelin
|align=left|Independent
|
|15.44%
|-
|style="background-color:"|
|align=left|Boris Salomatin
|align=left|Independent
|
|10.84%
|-
|style="background-color:"|
|align=left|Yury Rumyantsev
|align=left|Yabloko
|
|7.74%
|-
|style="background-color:"|
|align=left|Aleksandr Smirnov
|align=left|Communist Party
|
|7.06%
|-
|style="background-color:"|
|align=left|Valery Salakhov
|align=left|Independent
|
|4.34%
|-
|style="background-color:"|
|align=left|Aleksandr Ivanyuk
|align=left|Liberal Democratic Party
|
|2.31%
|-
|style="background-color:"|
|align=left|Ildar Ziganshin
|align=left|Independent
|
|1.03%
|-
|style="background-color:"|
|align=left|Sany Shiryazdanov
|align=left|Independent
|
|0.72%
|-
|style="background-color:#000000"|
|colspan=2 |against all
|
|7.33%
|-
| colspan="5" style="background-color:#E9E9E9;"|
|- style="font-weight:bold"
| colspan="3" style="text-align:left;" | Total
| 
| 100%
|-
| colspan="5" style="background-color:#E9E9E9;"|
|- style="font-weight:bold"
| colspan="4" |Source:
|
|}

2002

|-
! colspan=2 style="background-color:#E9E9E9;text-align:left;vertical-align:top;" |Candidate
! style="background-color:#E9E9E9;text-align:left;vertical-align:top;" |Party
! style="background-color:#E9E9E9;text-align:right;" |Votes
! style="background-color:#E9E9E9;text-align:right;" |%
|-
|style="background-color:"|
|align=left|Vladimir Aseyev
|align=left|Independent
|
|73.48%
|-
|style="background-color:"|
|align=left|Vladimir Belovodsky
|align=left|Independent
|
|1.93%
|-
|style="background-color:"|
|align=left|Andrey Turok
|align=left|Independent
|
|0.65%
|-
|style="background-color:#000000"|
|colspan=2 |against all
|
|21.03%
|-
| colspan="5" style="background-color:#E9E9E9;"|
|- style="font-weight:bold"
| colspan="3" style="text-align:left;" | Total
| 
| 100%
|-
| colspan="5" style="background-color:#E9E9E9;"|
|- style="font-weight:bold"
| colspan="4" |Source:
|
|}

2003

|-
! colspan=2 style="background-color:#E9E9E9;text-align:left;vertical-align:top;" |Candidate
! style="background-color:#E9E9E9;text-align:left;vertical-align:top;" |Party
! style="background-color:#E9E9E9;text-align:right;" |Votes
! style="background-color:#E9E9E9;text-align:right;" |%
|-
|style="background-color:"|
|align=left|Vladimir Aseyev (incumbent)
|align=left|United Russia
|
|43.11%
|-
|style="background-color:"|
|align=left|Sergey Kandakov
|align=left|Independent
|
|21.72%
|-
|style="background-color:"|
|align=left|Vladimir Krepkikh
|align=left|Independent
|
|4.77%
|-
|style="background-color:"|
|align=left|Galina Shustova
|align=left|Communist Party
|
|4.19%
|-
|style="background-color:"|
|align=left|Sergey Kovalev
|align=left|Rodina
|
|3.53%
|-
|style="background-color:"|
|align=left|Igor Kuzmin
|align=left|Liberal Democratic Party
|
|2.50%
|-
|style="background-color:#1042A5"|
|align=left|Larisa Murzina
|align=left|Union of Right Forces
|
|2.16%
|-
|style="background-color:#D50000"|
|align=left|Nina Polyakova
|align=left|Russian Communist Workers Party — Russian Party of Communists
|
|1.88%
|-
|style="background-color:#164C8C"|
|align=left|Vladimir Anaykin
|align=left|United Russian Party Rus'
|
|0.62%
|-
|style="background-color:#000000"|
|colspan=2 |against all
|
|14.42%
|-
| colspan="5" style="background-color:#E9E9E9;"|
|- style="font-weight:bold"
| colspan="3" style="text-align:left;" | Total
| 
| 100%
|-
| colspan="5" style="background-color:#E9E9E9;"|
|- style="font-weight:bold"
| colspan="4" |Source:
|
|}

2016

|-
! colspan=2 style="background-color:#E9E9E9;text-align:left;vertical-align:top;" |Candidate
! style="background-color:#E9E9E9;text-align:leftt;vertical-align:top;" |Party
! style="background-color:#E9E9E9;text-align:right;" |Votes
! style="background-color:#E9E9E9;text-align:right;" |%
|-
|style="background-color:"|
|align=left|Aleksandr Sidorov
|align=left|United Russia
|
|37.36%
|-
|style="background-color:"|
|align=left|Aleksandr Peterman
|align=left|Rodina
|
|14.20%
|-
|style="background-color:"|
|align=left|Vladimir Sysoyev
|align=left|Liberal Democratic Party
|
|12.68%
|-
|style="background:"| 
|align=left|Mikhail Serdyuk
|align=left|A Just Russia
|
|10.30%
|-
|style="background-color:"|
|align=left|Vyacheslav Tetyokin
|align=left|Communist Party
|
|6.05%
|-
|style="background-color: " |
|align=left|Vadim Abdurrakhmanov
|align=left|Communists of Russia
|
|4.10%
|-
|style="background-color: " |
|align=left|Svetlana Titova
|align=left|Yabloko
|
|4.07%
|-
|style="background-color:"|
|align=left|Aigul Zaripova
|align=left|Party of Growth
|
|2.48%
|-
|style="background-color:"|
|align=left|Vladimir Zinovyev
|align=left|Patriots of Russia
|
|1.78%
|-
|style="background-color:"|
|align=left|Sergey Vorobyov
|align=left|People's Freedom Party
|
|1.75%
|-
| colspan="5" style="background-color:#E9E9E9;"|
|- style="font-weight:bold"
| colspan="3" style="text-align:left;" | Total
| 
| 100%
|-
| colspan="5" style="background-color:#E9E9E9;"|
|- style="font-weight:bold"
| colspan="4" |Source:
|
|}

2021

|-
! colspan=2 style="background-color:#E9E9E9;text-align:left;vertical-align:top;" |Candidate
! style="background-color:#E9E9E9;text-align:left;vertical-align:top;" |Party
! style="background-color:#E9E9E9;text-align:right;" |Votes
! style="background-color:#E9E9E9;text-align:right;" |%
|-
|style="background-color:"|
|align=left|Vadim Shuvalov
|align=left|United Russia
|
|33.77%
|-
|style="background-color:"|
|align=left|Yevgeny Markov
|align=left|Liberal Democratic Party
|
|13.98%
|-
|style="background-color:"|
|align=left|Vyacheslav Tetyokin
|align=left|Communist Party
|
|11.82%
|-
|style="background:"| 
|align=left|Mikhail Serdyuk
|align=left|A Just Russia — For Truth
|
|11.44%
|-
|style="background-color: " |
|align=left|Vadim Abdurrakhmanov
|align=left|Communists of Russia
|
|9.86%
|-
|style="background-color:"|
|align=left|Vladimir Tseytlin
|align=left|New People
|
|8.27%
|-
|style="background-color:"|
|align=left|Timur Latipov
|align=left|Civic Platform
|
|3.28%
|-
| colspan="5" style="background-color:#E9E9E9;"|
|- style="font-weight:bold"
| colspan="3" style="text-align:left;" | Total
| 
| 100%
|-
| colspan="5" style="background-color:#E9E9E9;"|
|- style="font-weight:bold"
| colspan="4" |Source:
|
|}

Notes

References

Russian legislative constituencies
Politics of Khanty-Mansi Autonomous Okrug